In Colombian and Venezuelan cuisine, huevos pericos (English: "parrot eggs") refers to a dish prepared with scrambled eggs, butter, sautéed diced onions, bell pepper, and tomatoes. Scallions are a frequent substitution or addition to the onions, especially in Colombia. Huevos pericos may also include chopped cilantro greens, annatto for coloring, and occasionally hot peppers. It can be regarded as a tropical version of scrambled eggs and can be eaten alone, with bread, usually at breakfast time; or at any time, as an arepa filling.

The name comes from the bright colors of the scallions, tomato, peppers and eggs, mimicking the colors of a parrot (perico).

See also
Calentado
Bandeja paisa
 List of egg dishes

References

Venezuelan cuisine
Colombian cuisine
Egg dishes